Alessandro "Sandro" Pignatti (born 28 September 1930) is an Italian botanist specialising in pteridophytes and spermatophytes. The Australian plant species Calectasia pignattiana was named after him.  
On 31 May 1991 Pignatti received an honorary doctorate from the Faculty of Mathematics and Science at Uppsala University, Sweden.
He is an Honorary Member of the International Association for Vegetation Science (1997).

The specific epithet of the Western Australian plant species, Calectasia pignattiana honoured "Professors Erika and Alessandro Pignatti of Rome on the occasion of their seventieth birthdays".

References

20th-century Italian botanists
1930 births
Living people